Kutol may refer to:

Kutol Products Company
, village in Abkhazia

See also
Ruth Kutol (born 16 May 1973),  Kenyan long-distance and marathon runner